The 1971–72 season was the 70th in the history of the Western Football League.

The champions for the third time in their history, and the second season in succession, were Bideford.

Final table
The league was reduced from eighteen clubs to fourteen after Andover joined the Southern League, and Bath City Reserves, Bristol City Colts and Plymouth City all left. No new clubs joined.

References

1971-72
5